Fengxing Milk Co. is a Chinese dairy company located in Guangzhou, Guangdong Province. The company was established in 1952, with roots dating back to 1926, and is the first dairy company in the city. Fengxing owns numerous dairy farms in Guangzhou and produces milk supplied to schools across Guangdong province.

History 
In 1927, the company started as Sheng Kee Dairy (勝記牛奶公司).
In 1952, Fengxing Condensed Milk Factory was established.
In 1968, it had the largest dairy farm in southern China, combining the Sheng Kee Dairy.
In 1984, the company signs contract with Hong Kong's Kowloon Dairy, continuously providing milk to Hong Kong from that year. A joint venture company between the two companies, Kowloon Dairy (Guangzhou) Limited, is launched in 1994.
In 1987, it helped to set up a joint venture with Danone, which was later sold to Bright Dairy.
In 2020, the company was acquired by Yuexiu Holdings, and gained Five Rams Ice Cream assets from Nestlé one year later.

Products

References

Links 
Official website 

Dairy products companies of China
1952 establishments in China